Paula R. L. Heron is a Canadian-American physics educator who works as a professor of physics at the University of Washington.

Education
Heron has bachelor's and master's degrees in physics from the University of Ottawa in 1990 and 1991. She completed her Ph.D. at the University of Western Ontario in 1995.

Service
Heron is one of the founders and leaders of "Foundations and Frontiers in Physics Education Research", a biennial conference in physics education. In 2014 she became co-chair of the Joint Task Force on Undergraduate Physics Programs of the American Association of Physics Teachers and American Physical Society (APS). She was chair for the 2020 term of the APS Topical Group on Physics Education Research.

Recognition
In 2007, Heron was named a Fellow of the American Physical Society, after a nomination from the APS Forum on Education, "for "her leadership in the physics education research community and development and active dissemination of research-based curricula that significantly impact physics instruction throughout the world". She was part of the University of Washington Physics Education Group that was honored in 2008 with the APS Excellence in Physics Education Award, "for leadership in advancing research methods in physics education, promoting the importance of physics education research as a subdiscipline of physics, and developing research-based curricula that have improved students' learning of physics from kindergarten to graduate school".

References

External links
Home page

Year of birth missing (living people)
Living people
American physicists
American women physicists
Canadian physicists
Canadian women physicists
Physics educators
University of Ottawa alumni
University of Western Ontario alumni
University of Washington faculty
Fellows of the American Physical Society
American women academics
21st-century American women